Somerset Township is the name of two places in the U.S. state of Pennsylvania:
Somerset Township, Somerset County, Pennsylvania
Somerset Township, Washington County, Pennsylvania

See also
 Somerset, Pennsylvania (disambiguation)

Pennsylvania township disambiguation pages